Goyo: The Boy General, or simply Goyo, is a 2018 Filipino epic war film starring Paulo Avelino as the titular "Boy General", Gregorio del Pilar, who fought and died at the Battle of Tirad Pass during the Philippine–American War. It was written, directed, edited, and scored by Jerrold Tarog, and is a sequel to the 2015 film Heneral Luna, which chronicled Antonio Luna's life. Additional members of the ensemble cast include Carlo Aquino, Mon Confiado, Epy Quizon, Gwen Zamora, Empress Schuck, Alvin Anson, and Rafa Siguion-Reyna. It was released on September 5, 2018.

Plot
Following the assassination of General Antonio Luna, Gregorio "Goyo" del Pilar, a young and brash general, has been tasked by President Emilio Aguinaldo with hunting down Luna's loyalists in the Philippine Revolutionary Army. During a five-month discharge from combat in Bulacan, Goyo and his unit, which includes his older brother Julian, newly assigned photographer Joven Hernando, and his best friend Vicente Enriquez, capture Angel Bernal, the youngest of the Bernal brothers. They locate Angel's older brother Manuel hiding in the house of Don Mariano Nable José and torture him into joining Goyo's unit. When Manuel defiantly refuses and insults Goyo, they kill him.

While the Filipino army relaxes during which Goyo courts Don Mariano's daughter Remedios, the American forces prepare for a second offensive. General José Alejandrino, Luna's former ally spared from the purge, meets with Apolinario Mabini, who has resigned from Aguinaldo's cabinet after the death of Luna. Mabini implores Alejandrino to investigate Luna's death. Meanwhile, Aguinaldo joins Goyo and promotes him to Major-General of the Filipino army in Pangasinan. Aguinaldo meets up with Mabini and offers him the position of Chief Justice which Mabini reluctantly accepts.

In Manila, Alejandrino negotiates for peace with Generals Elwell Otis and Arthur MacArthur Jr., who both reject his proposal unless Aguinaldo surrenders. The war intensifies and the numerically superior Filipino forces suffer defeat after defeat in the hands of the heavily outnumbered but well-equipped Americans. Aguinaldo leads his army to Pozorrubio to meet with General Manuel Tinio and organize a new offensive. However, Tinio is revealed to have been defeated by the Americans, forcing Aguinaldo to retreat further north with Goyo assigned to command the vanguard. During the long and exhausting march through the mountainous terrain of the Cordilleras, the army, which carries Aguinaldo's family, is constantly harrassed by American troops and ongoing tensions with soldiers of Luna's old unit. As a result of the constant attacks, Aguinaldo's mother and son are both captured, putting further pressure on Goyo.

The army soon arrives at Mount Tirad where Goyo devises a delaying action to give Aguinaldo and the rest of the army enough time to escape. Together with Luna's former soldiers, including former Luna Sharpshooter Lieutenant García, fortified trenches are dug along the route of the mountain. On the following day, American troops, mostly from the 33rd Volunteer Infantry Regiment under Major Peyton C. March, quickly capture a town at the foot of the mountain. The battle begins and the Americans are initially unable to penetrate the defenses while suffering few casualties. With help from a local guide, the American troops find a secret path leading to the top of the mountain behind the trenches. Using the path, the Americans outflank the Filipinos. Having overcome his PTSD which he gained during the Battle of Kakarong de Sili in the Philippine Revolution, Goyo attempts to turn the tide of the battle but is shot dead by an American sniper. Learning of Goyo's death, the Filipino soldiers' morale breaks and they are easily overwhelmed. Joven and Garcia's son Kiko flee but Joven falls off a cliff after encountering an American soldier. In the aftermath of the battle, the Americans strip off Goyo's corpse and bury him at a crude grave in Mount Tirad. His grave is soon visited by Vicente, who survived the battle, and Felicidad, Goyo's former lover and Aguinaldo's younger sister.

Two years after the battle, Aguinaldo is captured by the Americans in Palanan, Isabela, effectively ending the war. Held as a prisoner of war in Malacañang Palace, Aguinaldo is visited by his former aide-de-camp Manuel Quezon, who has surrendered to the Americans on the orders of his commander, General Tomás Mascardo. Quezon consults Aguinaldo whether Mascardo should surrender or not which Aguinaldo replies that it is up to Mascardo himself to decide. Meanwhile, Mabini is captured by the Americans and exiled to Guam where he writes down his own narrative of the war, La Revolución Filipina ('The Philippine Revolution') which notes Aguinaldo's failure as leader of the Philippines. In a mid-credits scene, Joven is rescued by Kiko and Eduardo Rusca, Luna's former aide. Decades later, Quezon runs for president in 1935, while an older Eduardo and Joven give a dismayed Aguinaldo a small salute.

Cast

Other members of the ensemble cast are Christopher Aronson, RK Bagatsing, Carlo Cruz, Jason Dewey, Bret Jackson, Ethan Salvador, Lorenz Martinez, Karl Medina, Stephanie Sol, and Markki Stroem.

Production
Plans for a sequel to Jerrold Tarog's Heneral Luna went underway after its critical and commercial success. Tarog envisioned the sequel as being about Gregorio del Pilar, a young General who, like Heneral Lunas titular protagonist Antonio Luna, was among the Filipino historical figures during the Philippine–American War. Accordingly, Paulo Avelino, who played Del Pilar in Luna, came aboard to reprise his role.

Tarog's research for Goyo involved studying biographies authored by Teodoro Kalaw as well as crossing the Tirad Pass. Tarog again incorporated several prominent Filipino figures including the likes of Apolinario Mabini and Emilio Aguinaldo, aiming for a scope larger than what was present in Heneral Luna. Tarog co-wrote the film's screenplay with Rody Vera, who has said he had thoroughly studied Luna "to understand the flow of the conversations and other details unique to each character".

Goyo entered pre-production in January 2017. To prepare his scenes, Avelino underwent horseback riding lessons in March 2017. Tarog projected a 50-day film shoot, which began in May 2017. The complete ensemble cast was also revealed in a photo taken during the May shoot, including the likes of Mon Confiado as Emilio Aguinaldo, Epy Quizon as Apolinario Mabini, Benjamin Alves as Manuel L. Quezon, Leo Martinez as Pedro Paterno, and Alvin Anson as José Alejandrino, reprising their roles from Heneral Luna. Filming was completed on November 27, 2017, lasting 60 days. The production cost for the film is said to be triple the budget of Luna.

Release
On February 15, 2017, a 20-minute short film entitled Angelito was exclusively released during the theatrical premiere of I'm Drunk, I Love You to serve as a prelude to Goyo and to intertwine both the sequel and Heneral Luna. The film's teaser trailer was released on September 9, 2017. In May 2018, it was announced that the film would be released on September 5, 2018.

The film was made available on DVD on December 16, 2018. It also began streaming on Netflix starting January 26, 2019.

Reception

Critical reception
The film received praise for its acting, cinematography, music, and set design, which Zach Yonzon in Spot.PH highlighted as "some of the best in Philippine cinema". Yonzon also gave it a score of 3 out of 5, considering Goyo to be "masterfully done" though somewhat preposterously made. Writing for the Philippine edition of Esquire, Miguel Escobar called the film captivating: "It's a slow burn through the first half, but it's never boring and always beautiful." Fred Hawson of ABS-CBN News called it "subdued but powerful" and gave a score of 9 out of 10.

Accolades

Sequel
It was reported that the sequel to Goyo would be about President Manuel L. Quezon, with Benjamin Alves and TJ Trinidad set to reprise their roles as younger and older versions of Quezon respectively. However, director Jerrold Tarog's work on the sequel was postponed after Star Cinema hired him in 2018 to direct Darna. Tarog has said he would proceed with writing the script for the Quezon film by the time filming for Darna is completed.

See also
Sakay (1993)
Tirad Pass: The Last Stand of Gen. Gregorio del Pilar (1996)
José Rizal (1998)
Amigo (2010)
El Presidente (2012)
Katipunan (2013)
Bonifacio: Ang Unang Pangulo (2014)

References

External links

2018 war drama films
2010s historical films
2010s biographical drama films
Filipino-language films
Philippine war films
Philippine biographical films
Philippine epic films
Philippine films based on actual events
Philippine historical films
Philippine New Wave
Philippine sequel films
Biographical films about military leaders
Cultural depictions of Emilio Aguinaldo
Cultural depictions of Apolinario Mabini
Films directed by Jerrold Tarog
Films set in the 1890s
Films set during the Philippine–American War